The Flood Control Act of 1936,  (FCA 1936) was an Act of the United States Congress signed into law by President Franklin Delano Roosevelt on 22 June 1936. It authorized civil engineering projects such as dams, levees, dikes, and other flood control measures through the United States Army Corps of Engineers and other Federal agencies.  It is one of a number of Flood Control Acts passed on a regular basis by the United States Congress.  FCA 1936 was introduced in Congress by Riley J. Wilson (D, LA).

FCA 1936 dictated that Federal investigations and improvements of rivers and other waterways for flood control and allied purposes shall be under the jurisdiction of the War Department (precursor of the Department of Defense) under the supervision of the Chief of Engineers.  It further put watersheds, waterflow retardation, and soil erosion prevention under the U.S. Department of Agriculture.  Further, those authorities were not to interfere with reclamation projects by the Bureau of Reclamation of the Interior Department.

FCA 1936 was part of the profusion of important Depression Era legislation enacted by the 74th Congress in 1935–1936, including the Social Security Act, the National Labor Relations Act, the Banking Act of 1935, the Wealth Tax Act, the Public Utility Holding Company Act, the Rural Electrification Act, the Soil Conservation Service Act, and the $4.8 billion Emergency Relief Appropriation Act of 1935.

Significance
According to Joseph Arnold, author of The Evolution of the Flood Control Act of 1936, 

FCA 1936 declared that flood control was a national priority since floods constituted a menace to the national welfare.

Authorization
FCA 1936 authorized the expenditure of $310 million for flood control projects with no more than $50 million being expended in fiscal year 1937. Expenditure was conditioned on local interests participating by providing all lands, easements, and rights-of-way necessary for the construction of the projects, local interests holding and saving the Federal Government free from damages due to the construction works, and that local interests maintain and operate the projects after completion.

Projects covered by the Act

Dams
Kinzua Dam (begun in 1960, completed in 1965)
Optima Lake Dam (begun in 1966, completed in 1978)
 others

Levees
Mississippi River Levee near between Baton Rouge, LA and New Orleans, LA.

See also
For related legislation which sometime also implement flood control provisions, see the following:
Flood Control Act
Flood Control Act of 1937 - follow-on legislation
Water Resources Development Act
Rivers and Harbors Act

References

1936 in the environment
1936 in law
1936